The 2020 Northwestern State Demons football team represented Northwestern State University as a member of the Southland Conference during the 2020–21 NCAA Division I FCS football season. Led by third-year head coach Brad Laird, the Demons compiled an overall record of 1–5 with an indentical mark in conference play, placing last out of seven teams in the Southland. Northwestern State played home games at Harry Turpin Stadium in Natchitoches, Louisiana.

Previous season
The Demons finished the 2019 season 3–9, 3–6 in Southland play to finish eighth in Southland play.

Preseason

Recruiting class
Reference(s):

|}

Preseason poll
The Southland Conference released their spring preseason poll in January 2021. The Demons were picked to finish sixth in the conference. In addition, two Demons were chosen to the Preseason All-Southland Team

Preseason All–Southland Teams

Defense

1st Team
Ja'Quay Pough – Linebacker, SR

2nd Team
Shemar Bartholomew – Defensive Back, JR

Schedule

Game summaries

Nicholls

at Southeastern Louisiana

McNeese State

at Lamar

Sam Houston State

at Incarnate Word

Roster

References

Northwestern State
Northwestern State Demons football seasons
Northwestern State Demons football